Reynold D'Souza (born 8 September 1937) is a Kenyan field hockey player. He competed at the 1956 Summer Olympics and the 1964 Summer Olympics.

References

External links
 

1937 births
Living people
Kenyan male field hockey players
Olympic field hockey players of Kenya
Field hockey players at the 1956 Summer Olympics
Field hockey players at the 1964 Summer Olympics
Place of birth missing (living people)
Kenyan people of Indian descent
Kenyan people of Goan descent